Te doy la vida is a Mexican telenovela that premiered on Las Estrellas on 23 March 2020. The series is produced by Lucero Suárez for Televisa, is an adaptation of the Chilean telenovela of the same name written by María José Galleguillos. It stars José Ron, and Eva Cedeño.

Plot 
Nicolás (Leonardo Herrera) is a six-year-old boy suffering from leukemia and is in need of a bone marrow transplant to recover. In such a situation, the adoptive parents of the child, Elena (Eva Cedeño) and Ernesto (Jorge Salinas) will take on the task of searching for Nicolas' biological father. Thus, they arrive at the mechanical workshop where Pedro (José Ron) works to expose the situation, at which point the young man learns that he had a son from a past relationship.

Cast

Main 
An extensive cast list was published in October 2019 by the website Mastelenovelas.
 José Ron as Pedro Garrido, is a mechanic passionate about football.
 Eva Cedeño as Elena Villaseñor, is a woman who will fight to take care of her son.
 César Évora as Nelson López
 Erika Buenfil as Andrea Espinoza
 Nuria Bages as Ester Salazar
 Omar Fierro as Horacio Villaseñor
 Luz María Aguilar as Isabel
 Danny Perea as Gina López
 Ricardo Margaleff as Agustín "Agus" Preciado, Pedro's best friend.
 Óscar Bonfiglio as Domingo Garrido
 Camila Selser as Irene Villaseñor
 Ara Saldívar as Gabriela Villaseñor
 Ramsés Alemán as Samuel Garrido
 Arturo Carmona as Comandante Robles
 Miguel Ángel Biaggio as Modesto Flores
 Gloria Sierra as Mónica del Villar
 Dayren Chávez as Rosa García
 Mauricio Abularach as Jimmy
 José Manuel Lechuga as Chano
 Octavio Ocaña as Benito Rangel 
 Hugo Macías Macotela as Mariano
 Rocío de Santiago as Inés
 Marcela Salazar as Bernardina
 Santiago González as Dr. Vega
 Sachi Tamashiro as Vicky
 Leo Herrera as Nicolás Rioja
 Jorge Salinas as Ernesto Rioja,  is a man who has a very high ego and is manipulative.

Recurring 
 Luis Antonio Aguilar
 Sofía Vanni
 Lourdes Cobo

Ratings

Mexico ratings 
 
}}

U.S. ratings 
 
}}

Episodes 

Notes

References

External links 
 

Mexican television series based on Chilean television series
2020 telenovelas
2020 Mexican television series debuts
Television series about dysfunctional families
2020 Mexican television series endings
Televisa telenovelas
Mexican telenovelas
Spanish-language telenovelas